The 2019 World Touring Car Cup was the second season of the World Touring Car Cup and 15th overall of World Touring Cars promoted by Discovery Sports Events, which dates back to the 2005 World Touring Car Championship.

The drivers' championship was won by Norbert Michelisz. The teams' championship was won by Cyan Racing Lynk & Co.

Teams and drivers

Team and driver changes 
Cyan Racing made a return to the series with the all-new Lynk & Co 03 TCR after missing the 2018 season. Thed Björk was the first driver announced by the team. 2018 runner-up Yvan Muller was confirmed on 18 November 2018. Triple World Touring Car Champion winner Andy Priaulx will be making his return to the series with the team after 9-year absence. Yann Ehrlacher was the final driver to be announced by the team on 19 December 2018. M Racing–YMR, which was supported by Cyan Racing, was disbanded with M Racing (responsible for running the cars on behalf of YMR) moving to the TCR Europe Touring Car Series.

Nick Catsburg and Augusto Farfus drove for BRC Racing Team alongside series champion Gabriele Tarquini and Norbert Michelisz. To meet series regulations the team will be split into two entities of two cars with Tarquini and Michelisz racing under the BRC Hyundai N Squadra Corse banner, while Farfus and Catsburg will race under the BRC Hyundai N Lukoil Racing Team banner. Farfus last raced in the series in 2010 while Catsburg last raced in the series in 2017.

2018 FIA World Rallycross Championship and 2018 TCR Scandinavia Touring Car Championship winner Johan Kristoffersson is set to make series debut driving Volkswagen Golf GTI TCR, prepared by Sébastien Loeb Racing joining Robert Huff and Mehdi Bennani. Benjamin Leuchter was announced as the fourth driver for the team on 30 January 2018.

Néstor Girolami made his series comeback joining ALL-INKL.COM Münnich Motorsport alongside Esteban Guerrieri, replacing Yann Ehrlacher. The team also scaled down to two cars as the series' rules do not allow teams to run more than two cars. Timo Scheider, who drove for the team during the second half of the 2018 season, left the series, but will keep his association with the team in the FIA World Rallycross Championship.

After making one-off appearances for Boutsen Ginion Racing in 2018, Ma Qing Hua made his full season return with Team Mulsanne, joining Kevin Ceccon, who drove for the team during the second half of the 2018 season.

2018 ADAC TCR Germany third-place finisher Niels Langeveld joined Audi Sport Team Comtoyou joining Frédéric Vervisch, while Gordon Shedden and Jean-Karl Vernay remained with Audi Sport Leopard Team WRT. The second team entered by Comtoyou – Comtoyou Racing – switched from Audi RS 3 LMS TCR to CUPRA León TCR as the series do not allow more than four cars per manufacturer. Aurélien Panis will remain the team and was joined by Tom Coronel, who moved from Boutsen Ginion Racing while keeping his association with the team in the TCR Europe Touring Car Series. Denis Dupont, who raced for Audi Sport Team Comtoyou last season, was to remain with the Comtoyou team in the 2019 TCR Europe Touring Car Series, but he confirmed he withdrew from the TCR Europe Touring Car Series on the 17 April.

2018 TCR Europe Touring Car Series teams' winners KCMG entered the series, replacing Boutsen Ginion Racing, who later switched to the TCR Europe Touring Car Series, as the second Honda team. Tiago Monteiro will join the team alongside Attila Tassi, the 2017 TCR International Series runner-up and 4th placed in the 2018 TCR Europe Touring Car Series. Josh Files, who drove for the team in the 2018 TCR Europe Touring Car Series, left the team to join Target Competition in the same series.

2018 TCR Scandinavia Touring Car Championship teams' winners PWR Racing entered the series with support from Comtoyou Racing, replacing Campos Racing as the second CUPRA team. 2018 TCR Europe Touring Car Series winner Mikel Azcona and 2018 TCR Scandinavia Touring Car Championship third-place finisher and team co-owner Daniel Haglöf will drive for the team. Campos Racing drivers – Pepe Oriola and John Filippi – left the series with Oriola joining Indigo Racing in the TCR Asia Series, while Filippi would race for Vuković Motorsport in the TCR Europe Touring Car Series. Zengő Motorsport, which also ran CUPRA cars last season, also switched to TCR Europe Touring Car Series.
DG Sport Compétition will also switch to TCR Europe Touring Car Series with Aurélien Comte after Peugeot Sport reduced its support for the 308 TCR. Maťo Homola left the team to join Target Competition in the TCR Europe Touring Car Series.

Mid-season changes 
Augusto Farfus skipped the Guia Race of Macau due to clashing commitments with FIA GT World Cup held on the same weekend. As the series do not allow drivers race in different event held at the same weekend, he was replaced at BRC Hyundai N LUKOIL Racing Team by Luca Engstler, who had previously raced as wildcard entry at the Slovakiaring for Hyundai Team Engstler.

Calendar

The 2019 championship was contested in thirty rounds in Europe, Africa and East Asia.

A provisional calendar was released on 5 December 2018.

Calendar changes 

 The series made their first appearance in Malaysia, with the round held at the Sepang International Circuit as the season finale. The race supported the FIM Endurance World Championship.
 The second round in China, held at the Wuhan Street Circuit, was discontinued.
 The Race of Slovakia moved from July date to May date, running after Race of Hungary. This round will also support the FIM Endurance World Championship.
 The Race of Germany moved from May to June.
 In September 2019 it was announced that the Race of Japan would be held on Suzuka's East Course instead of full GP layout used previous year due to an inability to transition the circuit from motorcycles to cars and back in time.  It takes a considerable number of weeks to transition the full circuit with special FIM-approved barriers for events under Motorcycle Federation of Japan sanction, and the FIM barriers cannot be used for cars.  It marked a return of East Circuit to the schedule after the WTCR's predecessor – WTCC – ran the layout from 2011 to 2013.

Rule changes

Sporting changes 

 The grid capacity was increased from 26 to 32 entries. Teams are allowed to enter only two cars, while manufacturers are allowed to be represented by no more than 4 cars. Wildcard entries will not be eligible to score championship points.
 The point-scoring system will be overhauled for this season. Now both qualifying sessions will award points for the top 5 drivers and all three races will award an equal number of points for the top 15: 25, 20, 16, 13, 11, 10, 9, 8, 7, 6, 5, 4, 3, 2, 1.

Results

Championship standings
Scoring system

Drivers' championship
(key)

† – Drivers did not finish the race, but were classified as they completed over 75% of the race distance.

Teams' championship
(key)

† – Drivers did not finish the race, but were classified as they completed over 75% of the race distance.

Notes

References

External links
 

2019
World Touring Car Cup
World Touring Car Cup